Samuel McGaw VC (1838 – 22 July 1878) was a Scottish recipient of the Victoria Cross, the highest and most prestigious award for gallantry that can be awarded to British and Commonwealth forces.

Details
McGaw was about 36 years old, and a lance-sergeant in the 42nd Regiment of Foot (later The Black Watch Royal Highlanders), British Army during the First Ashanti Expedition when the following deed took place for which he was awarded the VC.

On 21 January 1874 at the Battle of Amoaful, Ashanti (now Ghana), Lance-Sergeant McGaw led his section through the bush in a most excellent manner and continued to do so throughout the day, although badly wounded early in the engagement.

Further information
He later achieved the rank of sergeant. He died of a fever whilst serving with his regiment in Cyprus. He is now buried in The Old British Cemetery in Kyrenia, North Cyprus.

The medal
Samuel McGaw's Victoria Cross is on public display in the Lord Ashcroft VC Gallery at the Imperial War Museum in London.

References

Monuments to Courage (David Harvey, 1999)
The Register of the Victoria Cross (This England, 1997)
Scotland's Forgotten Valour (Graham Ross, 1995)

British recipients of the Victoria Cross
Black Watch soldiers
British military personnel of the Third Anglo-Ashanti War
1838 births
1878 deaths
People from South Ayrshire
British military personnel of the Indian Rebellion of 1857
British Army recipients of the Victoria Cross